Sreejith Vijay is an Indian actor who works predominantly in Malayalam films. Currently he is more active on Malayalam television shows.

Personal life 
Sreejith was born on 28 March 1986 in Thripunithura to Vijayan and Rema. He completed B. Tech in Computer Science & Engineering and got into modeling. After completing assignments with high-profile clients like Bhima Jewels, Reliance Communications etc., he got his first break into movies when veteran director Fazil offered him a role in the movie Living Together. He has a younger brother, Saurav. He was working as a Radio Jockey in a Radio Station in UAE during the period October 2014 to February 2016. He married Archana on May 12, 2018.

Film career
He made his debut in 2011 through the Malayalam film Living Together. He shot to fame doing the lead role in Rathinirvedam, a remake of old Malayalam superhit Rathinirvedam.

Filmography

Television

References

External links 

Indian male film actors
Living people
Male actors from Kochi
1986 births
Male actors in Malayalam cinema
21st-century Indian male actors